is a Shinto shrine located in Misato, Miyazaki prefecture, Japan. It is dedicated to Ōhoyamatsumi and other kami.

Shinto shrines in Miyazaki Prefecture
8th-century establishments in Japan
Religious buildings and structures completed in 718
8th-century Shinto shrines